The Great Berlin Wheel was a giant Ferris wheel to be built near the Berlin Zoological Garden (Zoologischer Garten Berlin) in Berlin, Germany, by the Great Wheel Corporation.

The groundbreaking ceremony was on 3 December 2007 and completion was originally planned for 2008, but the project stalled after encountering financial obstacles.

If it had been built, it would have become the world's tallest Ferris wheel,  superseding the  Singapore Flyer (world's tallest 2008–2014).

References

Unbuilt Ferris wheels
Unbuilt buildings and structures in Germany